An altar crucifix or altar cross is a cross placed upon an altar, and is often the principal ornament of the altar.

History 
Early Christians were wary of publicly exposing the cross or crucifix for fear of subjecting it to the insults of pagans, or scandalizing the weak. To avoid this, they often used symbols like the anchor or trident.

The first appearances of a cross upon the altar occurred approximately in the 6th century, although it remained unusual for several centuries, and even discouraged. When it was used, it seems to have been only during the actual service, and was likely a processional cross detachable from its staff, and placed on the altar after processing. This was at first almost always a cross rather than a true crucifix; these began to be made specifically for altars in the late 11th century, and became more common from the 12th century, though they may have been expensive at first.  

By the start of the 13th century, treatises by Pope Innocent III expected there to be a cross between two candles on the altar during the Mass. This period was also the era when candlesticks, also probably carried in procession at the start of a service, started appearing upon altars instead of nearby, and as such marked a rather large evolution in the adornment of altars. Around the 14th century, altar crosses were almost universally replaced by crucifixes, probably now affordable by all churches, however, it was not until the 1570 Roman Missal of Pope Pius V that there is any mention of an obligation to have a crucifix on the altar.

Purpose and use

Catholic Usage

Roman Catholic liturgical norms require a crucifix (with the corpus or body of Jesus) near or on the altar whenever Mass is celebrated. In some cases, to better fulfill this requirement, the crucifix is instead hung on the wall behind the altar, so that when the priest is facing the congregation the crucifix is not obstructed. In some churches, the crucifix is hung mid-air via chains or metal cords, directly above the altar itself. This is called a rood cross, which may also refer to a crucifix placed on a beam above the altar, along with figures of the Blessed Virgin Mary and Saint John the Apostle, or above a rood screen.

Protestant Usage
Usage of an altar cross, or sometimes a crucifix, varies widely by custom. It is near universal in Anglican churches. Most mainline Protestant churches will have a cross displayed on or near the altar or communion table or at some central location. Lutheran churches retained both altar and crucifix (with the body of Jesus displayed) after the Reformation, and is the norm in Europe. The influence of the Reformed tradition, which comprises the Protestant majority in North America, many Lutheran churches there prefer a plain altar cross rather than a crucifix.

See also
 Processional Cross
 Crucifix
 Altar

References 

Altar crosses
Eucharistic objects
Crosses by function